Barry McIlheney (born 1960) is a British journalist, editor, broadcaster and publisher. Born in Belfast, Northern Ireland, McIlheney is a graduate of Trinity College, Dublin, Republic of Ireland, and London's City University.

Journalism and management career
After a brief spell in local newspapers and at Melody Maker magazine, McIlheney was appointed editor of Smash Hits in 1986, seeing its circulation rise double to 800,000 during his time in the job. From there he moved on to become launch editor of Empire magazine, which launched in May 1989. He was the managing editor of the UK version of Premiere magazine when in launched in September 1992.

In 1994, McIlheney became managing director of EMAP Metro, publishers of Empire and Smash Hits, as well as other titles such as Q and Mojo, and just after they had acquired FHM. In 1999 he launched Heat and a year later became chief executive of EMAP Elan, publishers of Elle, Red, and The Face. In 2003, McIlheney moved into new product development, overseeing the launch of Zoo both in the UK and Australia.

At the end of 2006, McIlheney moved to a consultancy role, working on new titles at EMAP. In January 2008 he became editor-in-chief at Sport Media Group. Responsible for a £1 million relaunch in April 2008 of their newspaper titles, the Daily Sport and Sunday Sport, McIlheney left the role the following July after a decline in sales, to another post within the company. In 2009 he launched media consultancy mcilheneybovis with newspaper art director Julian Bovis and has written for publications including The Word magazine.

McIlheney is Chief Executive of the Professional Publishers Association (PPA).

References

External links

The Word magazine
Media Week
The Guardian
McIlheneyBovis
The Independent

1960 births
British male journalists
Living people
Journalists from Northern Ireland
Editors from Northern Ireland
Broadcasters from Northern Ireland